Katherine Grey may refer to:

Lady Katherine Grey (1540–1568), younger sister of Lady Jane Grey
Katherine Grey (actress) (1873–1950), Broadway actress